Coconut Island, or Moku o Loe, is a 28-acre (113,000 m²) island in Kāneʻohe Bay off the island of Oʻahu in the state of Hawaiʻi, United States. It is a marine research facility of the Hawaiʻi Institute of Marine Biology (HIMB) of the University of Hawaiʻi.

History 
In 1934–1936, Chris Holmes II, an heir to the Fleischmann yeast fortune, doubled the original  island with coral rubble, sand, and earthen landfill. He established a residence with aquaria, kennels, and aviaries for his many pets. The island was converted to a rest and relaxation station for United States Navy flyers during World War II.

In 1946 a group of five Los Angeles businessmen, including Edwin W. Pauley, bought the island from the estate of Chris Holmes II with the idea of converting it to the exclusive Coconut Island Club International, 1946-7, and hired architects Paul Williams, A. Quincy Jones, and C.W. Lemmon of Belt Lemmon and Lo, Architects of Honolulu to design a community of cottages, tennis courts, a yacht club and other recreational facilities including remodeling the Holmes mansion and barracks. The Pauley group wanted to develop the island into a private, membership only resort. In 1949 this idea was dropped and a scaled-back Coconut Island Hotel with accommodation for 32 guests opened in February 1950.

In 1948, Pauley donated a portion of the island to the University of Hawaii to be used as a marine research facility. From the 1950s to the 1980s, the Pauley family used the island for summer get-aways and hosted many notable guests.  From the mid-80s to mid-90s Japanese real estate investor Katsuhiro Kawaguchi owned the island and permitted the University of Hawaii to use some of its areas for research. In 1995, the Edwin Pauley Foundation granted a gift of $9.6 million to the University of Hawaii Foundation to purchase the private half of the island and build new laboratories on it.

The island is now completely owned by the state and is the facility for the Hawaiʻi Institute of Marine Biology, part of the University of Hawaiʻi. It is the only U.S. laboratory built on a coral reef. (Heron Island, Lizard Island and a number of labs in the South Pacific are located outside of the U.S.)

Coconut Island was used for the opening sequence of the television program Gilligan's Island

Coconut island original name is Moku ‘o Lo’e which means island of Lo’e who was a lady that resided there in ancient times.

See also
Whitlow Au, researcher who worked on Coconut Island

Further reading

.

References

External links
2008 Institute bonds
Field Study
More on School of Ocean and Earth Science and Technology
Decomposition patterns in terrestrial and intertidal habitats on Oahu Island and Coconut Island, Hawaii
Monthly Tide Calendar for Coconut Island

Islands of Hawaii
Biological research institutes in the United States
Landforms of Oahu